Ledua Paul Senisea (born 14 April 2000) is a Fijian footballer who plays as a defender for Nadi FC and the Fiji women's national team.

References

2000 births
Living people
Women's association football defenders
Fijian women's footballers
Fiji women's international footballers